Michael Dunn or Mike Dunn may refer to:

 Michael Dunn (actor) (1934–1973), American actor and singer
 Michael Dunn (American football) (born 1994), American football player
 Michael Dunn (art historian) (born 1942), New Zealand writer and art historian
 Michael Dunn (cricketer) (born 1940), former English cricketer
 Michael Dunn (nutritionist), director of Brigham Young University's Department of Nutrition, Dietetics and Food Science
 Michael Dunn (politician) (1859–??), American politician
 Michael David Dunn, the perpetrator of the murder of Jordan Davis
 Michael A. Dunn, general authority of The Church of Jesus Christ of Latter-day Saints
 Michael V. Dunn, commissioner of the Commodity Futures Trading Commission
 Mike Dunn (baseball) (born 1985), former Major League Baseball pitcher
 Mike Dunn (snooker player) (born 1971), English snooker player
 Michael Dunn, American singer in the duo Dick and Dee Dee 
 Mickey Dunn, a character in CSI: Crime Scene Investigation episode "Living Legend"

See also 
 Michael Dunne (disambiguation)